Dustin Brown and Philipp Marx were the defending champions, but did not compete together this year. Brown partnered Christopher Kas and lost in the quarterfinals. Marx partnered Mateusz Kowalczyk and lost in the first round.

Ruben Bemelmans and Niels Desein won the title, defeating Andreas Beck and Philipp Petzschner in the final, 6–3, 4–6, [10–8].

Seeds

Draw

Draw

References
 Main Draw

Bauer Watertechnology Cup - Doubles
2014 Doubles